Washington Township is one of nine townships in Starke County, in the U.S. state of Indiana. As of the 2010 census, its population was 3,003 and it contained 1,201 housing units.

Geography

Cities, towns, villages
 Bass Lake (north edge)

Unincorporated towns
 Oak Grove at 
 Ober at 
(This list is based on USGS data and may include former settlements.)

Adjacent townships
 Oregon Township (north)
 West Township, Marshall County (east)
 Union Township, Marshall County (southeast)
 North Bend Township (south)
 California Township (southwest)
 Center Township (west)
 Davis Township (northwest)

Cemeteries
The township contains these two cemeteries: Holy Cross and Swartzell.

Lakes
 Eagle Lake

Major highways

School districts
 Knox Community School Corporation

Political districts
 Indiana's 2nd congressional district
 State House District 17
 State Senate District 5

References
 United States Census Bureau 2008 TIGER/Line Shapefiles
 United States Board on Geographic Names (GNIS)
 IndianaMap

External links
 Indiana Township Association
 United Township Association of Indiana

Townships in Starke County, Indiana
Townships in Indiana